rasdaman ("raster data manager") is an Array DBMS, that is: a Database Management System which adds capabilities for storage and retrieval of massive multi-dimensional arrays, such as sensor, image, simulation, and statistics data. A frequently used synonym to arrays is raster data, such as in 2-D raster graphics; this actually has motivated the name rasdaman. However, rasdaman has no limitation in the number of dimensions - it can serve, for example, 1-D measurement data, 2-D satellite imagery, 3-D x/y/t image time series and x/y/z exploration data, 4-D ocean and climate data, and even beyond spatio-temporal dimensions.

History 

In 1989, Peter Baumann started a research on database support for images, then at Fraunhofer Computer Graphics Institute. Following an in-depth investigation on raster data formalizations in imaging, in particular the AFATL Image Algebra, he established a database model for multi-dimensional arrays, including a data model and declarative query language. pioneering the field of Array Databases. Today, multi-dimensional arrays are also known as Data Cubes.

At TU Munich, in the EU funded basic research project RasDaMan, a first prototype was established, on top of the O2 object-oriented DBMS, and tested in Earth and Life science applications. Over further EU funded projects, this system was completed and extended to support relational DBMSs.
A dedicated research spin-off, rasdaman GmbH, was established to give commercial support in addition to the research which subsequently has been continued at Jacobs University. Since then, both entities collaborate on the further development and use of the rasdaman technology.

Concepts

Data model 

Based on an array algebra specifically developed for database purposes, rasdaman adds a new attribute type, array, to the relational model. As this array definition is parametrized it constitutes a second-order construct or template; this fact is reflected by the second-order functionals in the algebra and query language.

For historical reasons, tables are called collections, as initial design emphasized an embedding into the object-oriented database standard, ODMG. Anticipating a full integration with SQL, rasdaman collections represent a binary relation with the first attribute being an object identifier and the second being the array. This allows the establishment of foreign key references between arrays and regular relational tuples.

Raster Query Language 

The rasdaman query language, rasql, embeds itself into standard SQL and its set-oriented processing.
On the new attribute type, multi-dimensional arrays, a set of extra operations is provided which all are based on a minimal set of algebraically defined core operators, an array constructor (which establishes a new array and fills it with values) and an array condenser (which, similarly to SQL aggregates, derives scalar summary information from an array). The query language is declarative (and, hence, optimizable) and safe in evaluation - that is: every query is guaranteed to return after a finite number of processing steps.

The rasql query guide provides details, here some examples may illustrate its use:

 "From all 4-D x/y/z/t climate simulation data cubes, a cutout which contains all in x, a y extract between 100 and 200, all available along z, and a slice at position 42 (effectively resulting in a 3-D x/y/z cube)":
select c[ *:*, 100:200, *:*, 42 ] 
from   ClimateSimulations as c 

 "In all Landsat satellite images, suppress all non-green areas":
select img * (img.green > 130)
from   LandsatArchive as img

Note: this is a very naive phrasing of vegetation search; in practice one would use the NDVI formula, use null values for cloud masking, and several more techniques.

 "All MRI images where, in some region defined by the bit masks, intensity exceeds a threshold of 250":
select img
from   MRI as img, Masks as m
where  some_cells( img > 250 and m )

 "A 2-D x/y slice from all 4-D climate simulation data cubes, each one encoded in PNG format": 
select png( c[ *:*, *:*, 100, 42 ] )
from   ClimateSimulations as c

Architecture

Storage management 

Raster objects are maintained in a standard relational database, based on the partitioning of a raster object into tiles. Aside from a regular subdivision, any user or system generated partitioning is possible. As tiles form the unit of disk access, it is of critical importance that the tiling pattern is adjusted to the query access patterns; several tiling strategies assist in establishing a well-performing tiling. A geo index is employed to quickly determine the tiles affected by a query. Optionally, tiles are compressed using one of various choices, including lossless and lossy (wavelet) algorithms; independently from that, query results can be compressed for transfer to the client. Both tiling strategy and compression comprise database tuning parameters.

Tiles and tile index are stored as BLOBs in a relational database which also holds the data dictionary needed by rasdaman's dynamic type system. Adapters are available for several relational systems, among them open-source PostgreSQL.
For arrays larger than disk space, hierarchical storage management (HSM) support has been developed.

Query processing 

Queries are parsed, optimised, and executed in the rasdaman server. The parser receives the query string and generates the operation tree. Further, it applies algebraic optimisation rules to the query tree where applicable; of the 150 algebraic rewriting rules, 110 are actually optimising while the other 40 serve to transform the query into canonical form. Parsing and optimization together take less than a millisecond on a laptop.

Execution follows a tile streaming paradigm: whenever possible, array tiles addressed by a query are fetched sequentially, and each tile is discarded after processing. This leads to an architecture scalable to data volumes exceeding server main memory by orders of magnitude.
   
Query execution is parallelised. First, rasdaman offers inter-query parallelism: A dispatcher schedules requests into a pool of server processes on a per-transaction basis. Intra-query parallelism transparently distributes query subtrees across available cores, GPUs, or cloud nodes.

Client APIs 

The primary interface to rasdaman is the query language. Embeddings into C++ and Java APIs allow invocation of queries, as well as client-side convenience functions for array handling. Arrays per se are delivered in the main memory format of the client language and processor architecture, ready for further processing. Data format codecs allow to retrieve arrays in common raster formats, such as CSV, PNG, and NetCDF.

A Web design toolkit, raswct, is provided which makes the creation of Web query frontends easy, including graphical widgets for parametrized query handling, such as sliders for thresholds in queries.

Geo Web Services 

A Java servlet, petascope, running as a rasdaman client offers Web service interfaces specifically for geo data access, processing and filtering. 
The following OGC standards are supported: WMS, WCS, WCPS, and WPS.

For WCS and WCPS, rasdaman is the reference implementation.

Status and license model 

Today, rasdaman is a fully-fledged implementation offering select / insert / update / delete array query functionality. It is being used in both research and commercial installations.

In a collaboration of the original code owner, rasdaman GmbH and Jacobs University, a code split was performed in 2008 - 2009 resulting in rasdaman community, an open-source branch, and rasdaman enterprise, the commercial branch. Since then, rasdaman community is being maintained by Jacobs University whereas rasdaman enterprise remains proprietary to rasdaman GmbH.
The difference between both variants mainly consists of performance boosters (such as specific optimization techniques) intended to support particularly large databases, user numbers, and complex queries; Details are available on the rasdaman community website.

The rasdaman community license releases the server in GPL and all client parts in LGPL, thereby allowing the use of the system in any kind of license environment.

Impact and use 

Being the first Array DBMS shipped (first prototype available in 1996), rasdaman has shaped this recent database research domain. Concepts of the data and query model (declarativeness, sometimes choice of operators) find themselves in more recent approaches.

In 2008, the Open Geospatial Consortium released the Web Coverage Processing Service standard which defines a raster query language based on the concept of a coverage. Operator semantics is influenced by the rasdaman array algebra.

EarthLook is a showcase for OGC coverage standards in action, offering 1-D through 4-D use cases of raster data access and ad-hoc processing. EarthLook is built on rasdaman.

A sample large project in which rasdaman is being used for large-scale services in all Earth sciences is EarthServer, six services with a volume of at least 100 terabytes each have been set up for integrated data / metadata retrieval and distributed query processing.

References

Free database management systems
Proprietary database management systems
NoSQL
Query languages